Pathogenic fungi are fungi that cause disease in humans or other organisms. Although fungi are eukaryotic, many pathogenic fungi are microorganisms. Approximately 300 fungi are known to be pathogenic to humans; their study is called "medical mycology". Fungal infections kill more people than either tuberculosis or malaria—about 2 million people per year.

In 2022 the World Health Organization (WHO) published a list of fungal pathogens which should be a priority for public health action.

Markedly more fungi are known to be pathogenic to plant life than those of the animal kingdom. The study of fungi and other organisms pathogenic to plants is called plant pathology.

Pathogens of particular concern
According to the World Health Organization (WHO) in 2022 pathogens of particular concern are:
Critical priority Cryptococcus neoformans, Candida auris, Aspergillus fumigatus, Candida albicans.
High priority Nakaseomyces glabrata (Candida glabrata), Histoplasma spp., eumycetoma causative agents, Mucorales, Fusarium spp., Candida tropicalis, Candida parapsilosis.
Medium priority Scedosporium spp., Lomentospora prolificans, Coccidioides spp., Pichia kudriavzeveii (Candida krusei), Cryptococcus gattii, Talaromyces marneffei, Pneumocystis jirovecii, Paracoccidioides spp.

Candida

Candida species cause infections in individuals with deficient immune systems. Candida species tend to be the culprit of most fungal infections and can cause both systemic and superficial infection. Th1-type cell-mediated immunity (CMI) is required for clearance of a fungal infection.
Candida albicans is a kind of diploid yeast that commonly occurs among the human gut microflora.  C. albicans is an opportunistic pathogen in humans.  Abnormal over-growth of this fungus can occur, particularly in immunocompromised individuals.  C. albicans has a parasexual cycle that appears to be stimulated by environmental stress.

C. auris, first described in 2009, is resistant to many frontline antifungal drugs, disinfectants, and heat, which makes it extremely difficult to eradicate. Like many fungal pathogens it mostly affects immunocompromised people; if in the blood or other organs and tissues, mortality is about 50%.

Other species of Candida may be pathogenic as well, including Candida stellatoidea, C. tropicalis, C. pseudotropicalis, C. krusei, C. parapsilosis, and C. guilliermondii.

Aspergillus

The most common pathogenic species are Aspergillus fumigatus and Aspergillus flavus. Aspergillus flavus produces aflatoxin which is both a toxin and a carcinogen and which can potentially contaminate foods such as nuts. Aspergillus fumigatus and Aspergillus clavatus can cause allergic disease. Some Aspergillus species cause disease on grain crops, especially maize, and synthesize mycotoxins including aflatoxin. Aspergillosis is the group of diseases caused by Aspergillus. The symptoms include fever, cough, chest pain or breathlessness. Usually, only patients with weakened immune systems or with other lung conditions are susceptible.

The spores of Aspergillus fumigatus are ubiquitous in the atmosphere.  A. fumigatus is an opportunistic pathogen.  It can cause potentially lethal invasive infection in immunocompromised individuals.  A. fumigatus has a fully functional sexual cycle that produces cleistothecia and ascospores.

Cryptococcus

Cryptococcus neoformans can cause a severe form of meningitis and meningo-encephalitis in patients with HIV infection and AIDS. The majority of Cryptococcus species live in the soil and do not cause disease in humans. Cryptococcus neoformans is the major human and animal pathogen. Papiliotrema laurentii and Naganishia albida, both formerly referred to Cryptococcus, have been known to occasionally cause moderate-to-severe disease in human patients with compromised immunity. Cryptococcus gattii is endemic to tropical parts of the continent of Africa and Australia and can cause disease in non-immunocompromised people.

Infecting C. neoformans cells are usually phagocytosed by alveolar macrophages in the lung.  The invading C. neoformans cells may be killed by the release of oxidative and nitrosative molecules by these macrophages.  However some C. neoformans cells may survive within the macrophages.  The ability of the pathogen to survive within the macrophages probably determines latency of the disease, dissemination and resistance to antifungal agents.  In order to survive in the hostile intracellular environment of the macrophage, one of the responses of C. neoformans is to upregulate genes employed in responses to oxidative stress.

The haploid nuclei of C. neoformans can undergo nuclear fusion (karyogamy) to become diploid.  These diploid nuclei may then undergo meiosis, including recombination, resulting in the formation of haploid basidiospores that are able to disperse.  Meiosis may facilitate repair of C. neoformans DNA in response to macrophage challenge.

Histoplasma

Histoplasma capsulatum can cause histoplasmosis in humans, dogs and cats. The fungus is most prevalent in the Americas, India and southeastern Asia. It is endemic in certain areas of the United States. Infection is usually due to inhaling contaminated air.

Pneumocystis
Pneumocystis jirovecii (or Pneumocystis carinii) can cause a form of pneumonia in people with weakened immune systems, such as premature children, the elderly and AIDS patients.

Stachybotrys
Stachybotrys chartarum or "black mold" can cause respiratory damage and severe headaches. It frequently occurs in houses and in regions that are chronically damp.

Host defense mechanisms

Endothermy 
Mammalian endothermy and homeothermy are potent nonspecific defenses against most fungi. A comparative genomic study found that in opportunistic fungi there are few if any specialised virulence traits consistently linked to opportunistic pathogenicity of fungi in humans apart from the ability to grow at 37 °C.

Barrier tissues 
The skin, respiratory tract, gastrointestinal tract, and the genital-urinary tract induced inflammation are common bodily regions of fungal infection.

Immune response 
Studies have shown that hosts with higher levels of immune response cells such as monocytes/macrophages, dendritic cells, and invariant natural killer (iNK) T-cells exhibited greater control of fungal growth and protection against systemic infection. Pattern recognition receptors (PRRs) play an important role in inducing an immune response by recognizing specific fungal pathogens and initiating an immune response.
In the case of mucosal candidiasis, the cells that produce cytokine IL-17 are extremely important in maintaining innate immunity.

Link to extremotolerance 
A comprehensive comparison of distribution of opportunistic pathogens and stress-tolerant fungi in the fungal tree of life showed that polyextremotolerance and opportunistic pathogenicity consistently appear in the same fungal orders and that the co-occurrence of opportunism and extremotolerance (e.g. osmotolerance and psychrotolerance) is statistically significant. This suggests that some adaptations to stressful environments may also promote fungal survival during the infection.

See also

 List of human diseases associated with infectious pathogens
 Microbiology
 Microsporidia
 Mycology
 Plant pathology
 Plague Inc.

References

Further reading

External links
 Ecmm.eu: Official European Confederation of Medical Mycology website

.
Fungi and humans
Fungus common names
Mycology